Teenage Monster is a 1958 independently made science fiction-horror Western film. It was produced and directed by Jacques R. Marquette, and stars Anne Gwynne and Stuart Wade. The film had a first screening on December 25, 1957, in Los Angeles. It went into general theatrical release in January 1958, in a double feature with The Brain from Planet Arous; the pairing combined science fiction and Western film elements, both of which were very popular in the late 1950s.

Plot
In a 19th-century town in the Southwestern United States, young Charlie Cannon sees a meteorite crash in the desert. While exploring the crash site, he is exposed to mysterious rays emanating from the meteorite that cause him to begin aging rapidly. His mother, a gold prospector named Ruth, hides him and the town believes him dead.

However, in a short time span, Charlie ages ten years, while also becoming a hairy, aggressive, and completely psychopathic man-beast. He sometimes escapes his confinement, and terrorizes the community. After his mother strikes gold, she purchases a house in town in the hopes that living in a real home will soothe her son's inner beast. However, he scares more people and kidnaps a young woman, Kathy.

Ruth pays Kathy to keep her silence, but Kathy begins to blackmail Ruth and to manipulate Charlie to kill for her. In the final show-down, Charlie understands Kathy's lies and hurls her off a cliff before being shot and killed himself.

Cast
The cast includes:
 Anne Gwynne as Ruth Cannon
 Stuart Wade as Sheriff Bob
 Gloria Castillo as Kathy North
 Charles Courtney as Marv Howell
 Gilbert Perkins as adult Charlie Cannon / The Monster
 Stephen Parker as young Charlie Cannon
 Norman Leavitt as Deputy Ed
 Jim McCullough as Jim Cannon
 Gaybe Morradian / Gabe Mooradian as Fred Fox
 Frank Davis as Man on the street
 Arthur Berkeley as Man with burro

Production and reception
Jacques R. Marquette made the feature because his company needed a cheap film to run as a double bill with The Brain from Planet Arous (1957). Jacques Marquette also helped develop the film's plot and handled some of the cinematography. Jack Pierce handled the make-up effects. Teenage Monster was released by Marquette Productions Limited. The film's working title was Monster on the Hill, but it was theatrically released as Teenage Monster in an attempt to cash in on the success of horror films from other distributors that used the word "teenage" in their titles. When the film was released to television, the title was changed to Meteor Monster. The film – as Teenage Monster – was refused a United Kingdom rating certificate in 1959. In 1995, the film was finally released in the UK fully uncut and with a PG certificate rating. Writing in DVD Savant, film critic Glenn Erickson reported that the "film is so primitive that none of the ugly subtext seems to matter," that "Marquette's action direction is terrible," and that "[i]mpossible characters defeat the actors."

References

External links
 

1957 films
1957 horror films
1950s Western (genre) horror films
1950s science fiction horror films
American Western (genre) horror films
American black-and-white films
American science fiction horror films
Articles containing video clips
1950s English-language films
Films set in the 19th century
Films set in the Southwestern United States
Films about rapid human age change
1950s American films